The Panonian League (Croatian and Serbian: Panonska Liga, Панонска Лига) was one of the multinational ice hockey leagues in Europe. The league was established in 2002 and originally comprised teams from Hungary, Romania and Croatia. HK Vojvodina became the first Serbian team to join the league in 2003-04. The league was temporarily abandoned after 2003-04 when Hungarian and Romanian teams went on to establish their own joint league, called the MOL Liga. The Panonian League was revived in 2007 with Croatian and Serbian teams, lasting until 2009. In total there were four seasons, from 2002 to 2004, and from 2007 to 2009.

Teams

Former Teams

 Croatia
  KHL Medveščak II (2003–2004)
  KHL Mladost (2002–2004), (2007–2009)
  KHL Zagreb (2002–2004), (2007–2009)

 Hungary
  Ferencvárosi TC (2002–2004)

 Romania
  SC Miercurea Ciuc (2002–2004)
  Progym Hargita Gyöngye (2002–2003)
  
 Serbia
  HK Beostar (2007–2009)
  KHK Crvena Zvezda (2007–2009)
  HK Novi Sad (2007–2009)
  HK Partizan (2007–2009)
 / HK Vojvodina (2003–2004), (2007–2009)

Seasons and League Champions
 2002–2003 Season:  Ferencvárosi TC
 2003–2004 Season:  SC Miercurea Ciuc
 2007–2008 Season:  KHL Mladost
 2008–2009 Season:  HK Vojvodina

Season results overview

 [np] There were no playoffs that year. The team that finished in first place at the end of the regular season won the overall league title.

See also
Erste Liga

External links 
 Season 2002/03 at www.hockeyarchives.info
 Season 2003/04 at www.hockeyarchives.info
 Season 2007/08 at www.hockeyarchives.info
 Season 2008/09 at www.hockeyarchives.info
 Panonska liga - ima li budućnosti? at hrhokej.net

 
Defunct multi-national ice hockey leagues in Europe
Sports leagues established in 2002
Ice hockey leagues in Croatia
Ice hockey leagues in Hungary
Ice hockey leagues in Romania
Ice hockey leagues in Serbia